is a Japanese anime director of film and television. He is known for directing the 1980 and 2006 Doraemon series. He was born in  Asakusa, Taitō, Tokyo.

In 2012 he won Agency for Cultural Affair Award.

Works
Doraemon: Director
Doraemon: Nobita and the Castle of the Undersea Devil: Director
Doraemon: Nobita's Great Adventure into the Underworld: Director
Doraemon: Nobita's Little Star Wars: Director
Doraemon: Nobita and the Steel Troops: Director
Doraemon: Nobita and the Knights of Dinosaurs: Director
Doraemon: Nobita's Parallel "Journey to the West": Director
Doraemon: Nobita and the Birth of Japan: Director
Doraemon: Nobita and the Animal Planet: Director
Doraemon: Nobita in Dorabian Nights: Director
Doraemon: Nobita and the Kingdom of Clouds: Director
Doraemon: Nobita and Tin-Plate Labyrinth: Director
Doraemon: Nobita and Fantastic Three Musketeers: Director
Doraemon: Nobita's Genesis Diary: Director
Doraemon: Nobita and Galactic Express: Director
Doraemon: Nobita's Adventure in Clockwork City: Director
Doraemon: Nobita's South Sea Adventure: Director
Doraemon: Nobita Drifts in the Universe: Director
Doraemon: Nobita and the Legend of the Sun King: Director
Doraemon: Nobita and the Winged Braves: Director
Doraemon: Nobita and the Robot Kingdom: Director
Doraemon: Nobita and the Wind Wizard: Director
Doraemon: Nobita in the Wan-Nyan Spacetime Odyssey: Director
Makoto-chan: Director
Nintama Rantaro: Director
Ranma ½: Director (Season 1) 
Mighty Cat Masked Niyandar: Director

Books
 Tsutomu Shibayama and movie Doraemon world of "Nobita and the Robot Kingdom" (芝山努と映画ドラえもん『のび太とロボット王国(キングダム)』の世界). Shogakukan, 2002. 
 Doraemon: Nobita and the Wind Wizard Storyboard Collection (映画ドラえもん『のび太とふしぎ風使い』絵コンテ集). Shogakukan, 2003.

References

External links
 
 

1941 births
Living people
Japanese animators
Anime directors
Japanese film directors
Japanese animated film directors
Japanese television directors
People from Taitō